Maryland Route 122 (MD 122) is a state highway in the U.S. state of Maryland. Known as Security Boulevard and Cooks Lane, the state highway runs  from Rolling Road east to the Baltimore city limit within the western Baltimore County suburb of Woodlawn. MD 122 serves the headquarters of the Social Security Administration and connects the agency with Interstate 70 (I-70), I-695, and U.S. Route 40 (US 40). Security Boulevard was constructed in 1960 concurrent with the completion of the Social Security Administration's new headquarters. The six-lane divided highway and the Baltimore County portion of Cooks Lane were transferred from county to state maintenance around 1991.

Route description

MD 122 begins at an intersection with Rolling Road. The roadway continues west as the county-maintained portion of Security Boulevard, a four-lane divided highway that leads to the headquarters of the Centers for Medicare & Medicaid Services. MD 122 heads east as a six-lane divided highway through a commercial area. The state highway intersects Belmont Avenue just north of Security Square Mall before its partial cloverleaf interchange with I-695 (Baltimore Beltway) just north of the Beltway's stack interchange with I-70. There is no access between MD 122 and I-70 via I-695. East of the Beltway, the state highway intersects Woodlawn Drive and Gwynn Oak Avenue and passes along the northern edge of the Social Security Administration headquarters complex. East of the complex, MD 122 parallels Dead Run east and then southeast through a forested area, becoming four lanes at its intersection with Forest Park Avenue and Ingleside Avenue, the latter of which has a ramp to westbound I-70. The state highway continues through a partial cloverleaf interchange with I-70 just west of the Interstate's eastern terminus at a park and ride facility. At its southern intersection with Forest Park Avenue and an entrance ramp to the park and ride, MD 122 reduces to a two-lane undivided road and its name changes to Cooks Lane for the very short remainder of the highway to the boundary between Baltimore County and the city of Baltimore. Cooks Lane continues as an unnumbered residential street southeast through the West Hills neighborhood of Baltimore to US 40 (Edmondson Avenue).

History
Security Boulevard was constructed by Baltimore County specifically as an access road to the new Social Security Administration headquarters complex constructed in Woodlawn that opened in 1960. The new divided highway was built from the intersection of Forest Park Avenue and Cooks Lane north and west to a point west of Gwynn Oak Avenue in 1960. The boulevard was extended west to Belmont Avenue in 1963 contemporaneous with the completion of I-695 through Woodlawn. Security Boulevard was extended beyond Rolling Road to its present western terminus in 1972. The boulevard east of Rolling Road and the short adjacent portion of Cooks Lane in Baltimore County were transferred from county to state maintenance and designated MD 122 around 1991.

Junction list

See also

References

External links

MDRoads: MD 122
MD 122 at AARoads.com
Maryland Roads - MD 122, Security Blvd.

122
Roads in Baltimore County, Maryland